Chad Kevin Lunsford (born February 24, 1977) is an American football coach who is currently the tight ends coach at Florida Atlantic. He previously served as the head coach of the Georgia Southern Eagles football team.  He was awarded the job on November 27, 2017 after serving as interim for the second half of the season following the firing and departure of Tyson Summers. Following a 1–3 start, Lunsford was fired by Georgia Southern early in the 2021 season.

Early life and education
Lunsford attended and played football at Elbert County High School in Elberton, Georgia. He graduated from Georgia College and State University in Milledgeville in May 2000 with a degree in biology and a minor in mathematics. While attending Georgia College as an undergraduate, he served as a student assistant at cross-town Georgia Military College. He holds a Master's of Sport Science from the United States Sports Academy.

Head coaching record

Personal life
Lunsford is married to Tiffany “Tippy” Lunsford. They have three children. Lunsford is a Christian.

References

External links
 Georgia Southern profile

1977 births
Living people
Appalachian State Mountaineers football coaches
Auburn Tigers football coaches
Georgia Southern Eagles football coaches
High school football coaches in Georgia (U.S. state)
People from Elberton, Georgia